Patrick Dominic Quinn (February 12, 1950 – September 24, 2006) was an American actor. From 2000 until his death in 2006, he was the president of Actors' Equity Association.

Early life 
Quinn was born in Philadelphia, Pennsylvania, the son of a mortician. He had three brothers and one sister. Quinn studied theater at the Temple University and took his first role in a touring company of Man of La Mancha. He helped start the Charade Dinner Theater, the first Equity dinner theater in metropolitan Philadelphia.

Career 
His first Broadway role was in the 1976 revival of Fiddler on the Roof. He also appeared in the productions of Lend Me a Tenor, Beauty and the Beast, A Class Act and the 1998 revival of The Sound of Music.

Quinn's television credits included roles on the shows Bosom Buddies, Edens Lost and Remember WENN, as well as all three current versions of the NBC crime drama Law & Order. Quinn's voice was also featured as the main character in a Schoolhouse Rock! song, "Tax Man Max".

Quinn, who had been a member of Equity since 1970, was elected to the council in 1977. He was elected president in 2000. In 1987, he helped organize the non-profit organization Equity Fights AIDS, which later merged with Broadway Cares. At the time of his death, he was scheduled to succeed Alan Eisenberg as executive director of the association.

Death 
Quinn died of a heart attack at his country home in Bushkill, Pennsylvania, aged 56. He was survived by his partner of twelve years, Martin Casella.

Filmography

Film

Television

References

External links 
 
 

1950 births
2006 deaths
20th-century American male actors
21st-century American male actors
20th-century American LGBT people
21st-century American LGBT people
American gay actors
American male stage actors
American male television actors
Male actors from Philadelphia
Presidents of the Actors' Equity Association
Temple University alumni